In 1942, a medium tank was proposed to be produced by the Axis-aligned Kingdom of Romania. The reason behind the proposal was the lack of a Romanian-produced armored fighting vehicle capable of challenging enemy Soviet tanks on the Eastern Front, as well as the allied Nazi Germany not being capable of supplying Romania with considerable amounts of tanks. The vehicle never saw production.

Background

From the moment the Romanians first encountered Soviet T-34 and KV-1 tanks in late 1941, it was obvious that not a single tank or gun in the Romanian inventory was able to tackle them on reasonable terms. Furthermore, the allied Germans were not prepared to supply such weapons as long as their own forces were short. By late 1942, apart from some T-3s and T-4s, the Romanian army was only equipped with obsolete R-1, R-2 and R35 tanks. This led to different proposals to produce a Romanian vehicle capable to threaten Soviet ones; one such proposal was that of a medium tank.

History

By the end of 1942, the Romanian Army Headquarters and the Third Army's leadership definitized a set of proposals regarding the production of a tank in Romania. They wanted to avoid producing a light tank, since such vehicles proved to be "an easy prey for the enemy". Thus, the proposed Romanian vehicle was to include elements comparable to those of German armor that were considered superior to those of Soviet tanks. The 1st Armored Regiment was asked for advice regarding the tank's characteristics.

British historian Mark Axworthy states that the Romanians had planned to locally produce the Soviet T-34 with some gun technology changes incorporated from the German Panzer IV, and that wartime leader Ion Antonescu himself proposed this vehicle. However, an original Romanian medium tank was also proposed, whose characteristics were partially comparable to those of the aforementioned Soviet and German tanks: Its planned weight was of 16-18 tonnes; it would have been able to reach 50 km/h; the crew would have consisted of four members; the main gun was to have a caliber of 50 mm or higher; secondary armament would have consisted of one or two machine guns; the armor was to be 40-60 mm thick; and the height of 2 m or less. 

The tank never went beyond the proposal stage. Instead, a number of tank destroyers were produced by Romania: the Mareșal, TACAM T-60, TACAM R-2 and VDC R35. According to Mark Axworthy, this was because of the Romanian industry not being able to produce a medium tank of such characteristics. The idea of producing a medium tank, however, was not at all a new concept in Romania. The first such proposal came in 1926 as an offer by the Reșița works to  produce a British Vickers tank under license, weighing 10.5 tonnes and reaching 24 km/h (which indicates it was the Medium Mk. I). Later, in 1934, a study stated that "the production of a medium tank at the Reșița works is not out of question". During World War II, in 1940, Romania applied to Germany for a license to build a local version of the Škoda T-21 tank in 216 examples; this planned vehicle was designated R-3. Germany refused to provide the license, since Romania was not yet part of the Axis. Then, in May 1942, Germany again refused a Romanian request to locally build the Škoda T-23, since it would have required importing armor plate from the Škoda Works. Both of those Škoda tanks were in some ways similar to the 1942 medium tank project – they had weaker armor and armament, however.

The suggested weight of 16-18 tonnes seems to be very reduced for a tank of such characteristics. It is possible that it would have been heavier, had it been produced, or that it would have been small in dimensions (as was the Mareșal tank destroyer, developed in parallel, which stood at only 1.54 m tall). The proposed gun could have been a 50 mm one taken from inoperable Panzer IIIs, which were used in the Romanian army; since higher calibers were also considered, it is possible that the 75 mm Reșița M1943, the 76 mm ZiS-3 or the 76 mm F-22 guns (all of which were used on the above-mentioned Romanian tank destroyers) would have been considered for use.

Possible name

The planned medium tank never came to be produced. Instead, the parallelly developed Mareșal tank destroyer (whose development had also started in late 1942) was named after Ion Antonescu, Romania's wartime leader, who had the rank of Marshal (Mareșal). Had the medium tank made it into production, it is very possible that the tank destroyer would have not, and that, thus, the Mareșal name would have been used for the medium tank instead.

See also

Vehicles comparable in characteristics

 American M4 Sherman
 Argentine Nahuel DL 43
 Australian Sentinel
 Australian Thunderbolt
 British Cromwell
 Canadian Ram
 French Char G1
 German Panzer III
 German Panzer IV
 Italian P26/40
 Italian P43
 Japanese Type 3 Chi-Nu
 Soviet T-34

Notes

References

Bibliography
 
 
 
 
 
 

Military history of Romania during World War II
World War II armoured fighting vehicles of Romania
World War II medium tanks
Armoured fighting vehicles of World War II
World War II tanks